The University of Washington College of Education is the school of education at the University of Washington (UW). The UW College of Education offers both undergraduate and graduate degrees and is one of the top schools of education in the United States.

Led by Dean Mia Tuan, the mission of the UW College of Education is to transform inequitable systems of education to create just, sustainable and culturally-thriving democracies by engaging in dynamic, collaborative partnerships, practices and research.

History 
Preparing teachers was an important function of the University of Washington from its early days. After becoming the Territorial University's first graduate in 1876, Clara McCarty taught in various schools and was elected superintendent of the Pierce County School District in 1880.

The university established a specific program to train teachers, called the "Normal" curriculum, in 1878. The University of Washington Normal College was established in 1892–1893, with a series name changes occurring over the next several years: Department of Pedagogy, 1893–1894; Department of Education, 1895–1896; Department of Philosophy of Education, 1896–1897; Department of Education, 1897–1898; School of Pedagogy, 1898–1899; before the name Department of Education was retained for more than a decade beginning in 1900–1901.

On January 21, 1913, the university introduced a School of Education. The College of Education was officially formed December 15, 1914, as a four-year program with authority over graduation and curriculum decisions.

Degree programs 
The college offers two doctoral programs: the Doctor of Philosophy in Education (Ph.D.) and the Doctor of Education (Ed.D.). It also offers more than a dozen master's programs, including Education Policy, Organizations and Leadership; Early Childhood Special Education; Education Policy, Organizations and Leadership; Instructional Leadership; Intercollegiate Athletic Leadership; Language, Literacy, and Culture; Leadership in Higher Education; Learning Sciences and Human Development; Measurement and Statistics; Multicultural Education; Social and Cultural Foundations; Special Education; and Teaching. Bachelor's degree programs are offered in Early Care and Education; Early Childhood and Family Studies; and Education, Communities and Organizations.

Faculty 
Notable current and past faculty of the college include:

 James A. Banks
 John D. Bransford
 John Goodlad
 Elham Kazemi
 Kenneth Zeichner

Notable alumni 
Notable alumni of the college include:

 Diana Hess
 Gloria Ladson-Billings 
 Charli Turner Thorne

Facilities 

The college's primary home is Miller Hall on the main campus of the University of Washington in Seattle. It is part of the Liberal Arts Quadrangle, commonly known as the Quad. Completed in 1922 and originally called Education Hall, the building was renamed in 1954 to honor the family of long-time University of Washington Regent William Winlock Miller. The building features a collection of more than 30 figures by Victor Alonzo Lewis along its cornice. The figures represent educational subjects such as music and geography; historical figures including Alexander the Great and Confucius; various professions; and methods of pedagogy (reading and laboratory experiments) among others. Miller Hall contains numerous classrooms and offices.

Other buildings associated with the college include the Haring Center for Inclusive Education and Gilman Building.

References

External links 
 

Colleges, schools, and departments of the University of Washington
Schools of education in the United States
Educational institutions established in 1914
1914 establishments in Washington (state)